Bapgaon is a village in the Thane district of Maharashtra, India. It is located in the Bhiwandi taluka. Simplest way to reach there is take a padgha village bus from kalyan bus depot.

Demographics 

According to the 2011 census of India, Bapgaon has 181 households. The effective literacy rate (i.e. the literacy rate of population excluding children aged 6 and below) is 78.39%.

References 

Villages in Bhiwandi taluka